DemocracyNZ is a registered political party in New Zealand. The party was established and led by former National Party MP Matt King following the anti-vaccination occupation at parliament. The party claims to be centrist and stand for democracy, equality, and unity for New Zealanders.

On 12 October 2022 the party's registration was approved by the Electoral Commission.

History

Background

In February 2022, King announced that he would join Convoy 2022, a protest against COVID-19 vaccination mandates on Parliament's grounds. King said that his main concern was the vaccine mandates, and that the anti-vaccination component of the protest was "very small". The National Party distanced themselves from King's remarks, saying that "Matt King is no longer an MP for the National Party" and that the party "does not support the actions or the anti-vaccination messages of those involved in Convoy 2022." King said in an interview that he knew that his position could end hopes of re-selection as a National Party candidate but that he needed to stand on his principles. He later resigned from the National Party due to this position.

In May 2022, King was trespassed from Parliament grounds for two years after attending the 2022 anti-vaccine mandate protest outside Parliament. The Spinoff editor Toby Manhire criticised the Speaker of the House Trevor Mallard and the Parliament security manager Bridget Lord's decision to trespass King; opining that it violated the freedom to protest and played into the hands of anti-vaccine protesters. The trespass notice was subsequently withdrawn by the Speaker.

In March 2022, following the Wellington protests, King launched a new party called DemocracyNZ. He described it as standing on a platform of "democracy, unity, freedom of choice, freedom of expression, access and inclusion" and said it sought to "uphold the Bill of Rights". According to King, about 2000 people signed up to become members within 48 hours of the party's launch.

Electoral history
The party's first opportunity to stand was in the 2022 Tauranga by-election, but King announced the party would not be contending as it was only recently formed.

The party has since announced 3 additional candidates in its website news.

References 

2022 establishments in New Zealand
Political parties established in 2022
Political parties in New Zealand
Anti-vaccination organizations